The enzyme deacetylisoipecoside synthase (EC 4.3.3.3) catalyzes the chemical reaction

deacetylisoipecoside + H2O  dopamine + secologanin

This enzyme belongs to the family of lyases, specifically amine lyases, which cleave carbon-nitrogen bonds.  The systematic name of this enzyme class is deacetylisoipecoside dopamine-lyase (secologanin-forming). It is also called deacetylisoipecoside dopamine-lyase.  It participates in indole and ipecac alkaloid biosynthesis.

References

 

EC 4.3.3
Enzymes of unknown structure